The Place de l'Opéra is a square in the 9th arrondissement of Paris, at the junction of the Boulevard des Italiens, Boulevard des Capucines, Avenue de l'Opéra, Rue de la Paix and . It was built at the same time as the Opéra Garnier (designed by Charles Garnier), which is sited on it and after which it is named. Both structures were part of the Haussmannian redesign of Paris under Napoleon III of France.

2, place de l’Opéra

The building at No. 2, on the corner of rue du Quatre-Septembre, was built between 1868 and 1873 on a design by architect Henri Blondel.

It is now used by the CNEP's successor bank BNP Paribas.

Transportation

External links

Opera
Buildings and structures in the 9th arrondissement of Paris
Articles containing video clips